Chris Tardio is an American actor known for his roles in The Sopranos, Ray Donovan, Daredevil, and Younger. Tardio is also a writer, producer, and photographer.

Filmography

Film

Television

Video games

References 

Living people
Year of birth missing (living people)
Place of birth missing (living people)
American video game actors